Yasur can refer to:
 Yasur, Iran, in Gilan Province
 Mount Yasur, a volcano in Vanuatu
 Yas'ur, Israel, a kibbutz in Israel
 Yasur (village), in Gaza District
 Yazur, in Jaffa District
 CH-53 Sea Stallion, Hebrew name is Yas'ur